Coryphella is a genus of sea slugs, specifically aeolid nudibranchs, marine gastropod molluscs in the family Coryphellidae.

Species 
Species within the genus Coryphella are as follows:
 Coryphella abei Baba, 1987
 Coryphella alexanderi Ekimova, 2022
 Coryphella amabilis (Hirano & Kuzirian, 1991)
 Coryphella athadona Bergh, 1875
 Coryphella borealis Odhner, 1922
 Coryphella browni Picton, 1980
 Coryphella californica Bergh, 1904
 Coryphella capensis Thiele, 1925
 Coryphella chriskaugei  (Korshunova, Martynov, Bakken, Evertsen, Fletcher, Mudianta, Saito, Lundin, Schrödl & Picton, 2017)
 Coryphella cooperi Cockerell, 1901
 Coryphella falklandica Eliot, 1907
 Coryphella fogata (Millen & Hermosillo, 2007)
 Coryphella gracilis (Alder & Hancock, 1844)
 Coryphella insolita (García-Gómez & Cervera, 1989)
 Coryphella lineata (Lovén, 1846)
 Coryphella monicae  (Korshunova, Martynov, Bakken, Evertsen, Fletcher, Mudianta, Saito, Lundin, Schrödl & Picton, 2017)
 Coryphella nobilis A. E. Verrill, 1880
 Coryphella orjani  (Korshunova, Martynov, Bakken, Evertsen, Fletcher, Mudianta, Saito, Lundin, Schrödl & Picton, 2017)
 Coryphella pallida A. E. Verrill, 1900
 Coryphella sanamyanae  (Korshunova, Martynov, Bakken, Evertsen, Fletcher, Mudianta, Saito, Lundin, Schrödl & Picton, 2017)
 Coryphella trilineata O'Donoghue, 1921
 Coryphella trophina (Bergh, 1890)
 Coryphella verrucosa (M. Sars, 1829)
 Coryphella verta Ev. Marcus, 1970

Synonyms
 Coryphella albomarginata Miller, 1971: synonym of Coryphellina albomarginata
 Coryphella athadona Bergh, 1875: synonym of Occidenthella athadona (Bergh, 1875)
 Coryphella beaumonti Eliot, 1906: synonym of Cumanotus beaumonti (Eliot, 1906)
 Coryphella borealis: synonym of Gulenia borealis
 Coryphella bostoniensis (Couthouy, 1838): synonym of Facelina bostoniensis (Couthouy, 1838)
 Coryphella browni: synonym of Fjordia browni
 Coryphella capensis Thiele, 1925: synonym of Fjordia capensis (Thiele, 1925)
 Coryphella cooperi Cockerell, 1901: synonym of Flabellina cooperi(Cockerell, 1901): synoinym of Orienthella cooperi (Cockerell, 1901)
 Coryphella cynara Ev. Marcus & Er. Marcus, 1967: synonym of Kynaria cynara (Ev. Marcus & Er. Marcus, 1967)
 Coryphella dushia Ev. Marcus & Er. Marcus, 1963: synonym of Flabellina dushia (Ev. Marcus & Er. Marcus, 1963) (original combination)
 Coryphella falklandica: synonym of Itaxia falklandica Coryphella fisheri MacFarland, 1966: synonym of Orienthella trilineata (O'Donoghue, 1921)
 Coryphella fusca O'Donoghue, 1921: synonym of Himatina trophina (Bergh, 1890)
 Coryphella gracilis (Alder & Hancock, 1844): synonym of Microchlamylla gracilis (Alder & Hancock, 1844)
 Coryphella islandica Odhner, 1937: synonym of Paracoryphella islandica (Odhner, 1937)
 Coryphella japonica Volodchenko, 1941 synonym of Ziminella japonica (Volodchenko, 1941)
 Coryphella laevidens Knipowitsch, 1902: synonym of Ziminella salmonacea (Couthouy, 1838)
 Coryphella lineata: synonym of Fjordia lineata (Lovén, 1846)
 Coryphella mananensis (Stimpson, 1853): synonym of Coryphella verrucosa (M. Sars, 1829)(junior synonym)
 Coryphella nobilis: synonym of Borealea nobilis (A. E. Verrill, 1880)
 Coryphella ornata Risbec, 1928: synonym of Flabellina bicolor (Kelaart, 1858): synonym of Samla bicolor (Kelaart, 1858)
 Coryphella parva: synonym of Flabellina parva Coryphella pedata: synonym of Edmundsella pedata (Montagu, 1815)
 Coryphella pellucida: synonym of Carronella pellucida Coryphella piunca Marcus, 1961: synonym of Orienthella trilineata (O'Donoghue, 1921)
 Coryphella polaris: synonym of Polaria polaris Volodchenko, 1946
 Coryphella pseudoverrucosa Martynov, Sanamyan & Korshunova, 2015: synonym of Coryphella verrucosa (M. Sars, 1829) 
 Coryphella pricei MacFarland, 1966: synonym of Apata pricei (MacFarland, 1966)
 Coryphella rufibranchialis (G. Johnston, 1832): synonym of Flabellina verrucosa (M. Sars, 1829): synonym of Coryphella verrucosa (M. Sars, 1829)
 Coryphella rutila Verrill, 1879: synonym of Carronella pellucida (Alder & Hancock, 1843)
 Coryphella salmonacea: synonym of Ziminella salmonacea (Couthouy, 1838)
 Coryphella sarsi: synonym of Borealea nobilis Coryphella stimpsoni (A. E. Verrill, 1879): synonym of Ziminella salmonacea (Couthouy, 1838)
 Coryphella trilineata O'Donoghue, 1921: synonym of  Orienthella trilineata'' (O'Donoghue, 1921) (original combination)

References

Coryphellidae
Gastropod genera